An election to Longford County Council took place on 5 June 2009 as part of that year's Irish local elections. 21 councillors were elected from four electoral divisions by PR-STV voting for a five-year term of office.

Results by party

Results by Electoral Area

Ballymahon

Drumlish

Granard

Longford

External links
 Official website

2009 Irish local elections
2009